The 1950 Troy State Red Wave football team represented Troy State Teachers College (now known as Troy University) as a member of the Alabama Intercollegiate Conference (AIC) during the 1950 college football season. Led by fourth-year head coach Fred McCollum, the Red Wave compiled an overall record of 3–6–1, with a mark of 1–1–1 in conference play.

Schedule

References

Troy State
Troy Trojans football seasons
Troy State Red Wave football